Toucheng is a railway station on the Taiwan Railways Administration Yilan line located in Toucheng Township, Yilan County, Taiwan.

History
The station was opened on 25 April 1920.

Around the station 
 Lan Yang Institute of Technology
 Lanyang Museum
 Lee Rong-chun Literary Museum
 Toucheng Old Street
 Wushi Harbor

See also
 List of railway stations in Taiwan

References

1920 establishments in Taiwan
Railway stations in Yilan County, Taiwan
Railway stations opened in 1920
Railway stations served by Taiwan Railways Administration